Selfie is a studio album by Italian singer Mina. It was released originally on June 10, 2014  and also released on vinyl on June 17, 2014. It is Mina's first album of new songs since Piccolino in 2011.

Track listing

Weekly charts

References

Mina (Italian singer) albums
2014 albums